Dolicharthria retractalis is a species of moth in the family Crambidae. It was described by George Hampson in 1912. It is found in Mexico.

Taxonomy
Dolicharthria retractalis Hampson, 1917 is a secondary homonym. A replacement name is not yet available.

References

Moths described in 1912
Spilomelinae
Moths of Central America